Giulio Doffi, O.P., also Giulio Doffius, (1534 – 27 August 1596) was a Roman Catholic prelate who served as Bishop of Alessano from 1595 to 1596.

Biography
Giulio Doffi was born in 1534 and ordained a priest in the Order of Preachers. On 6 March 1595, he was appointed during the papacy of Pope Clement VIII as Bishop of Alessano. On 2 April 1595, he was consecrated bishop by Giulio Antonio Santorio, Cardinal-Priest of Santa Maria in Trastevere, with Flaminio Filonardi, Bishop of Aquino, and Leonard Abel, Titular Bishop of Sidon, serving as co-consecrators. He served as Bishop of Alessano until his death on 27 August 1596. While bishop, he was the principal co-consecrator of Vincent Correrio Cammerota, Coadjutor Bishop of Muro Lucano (1595).

References

External links and additional sources
 (for Chronology of Bishops) 
 (for Chronology of Bishops) 

16th-century Italian Roman Catholic bishops
1534 births
1596 deaths
Bishops appointed by Pope Clement VIII
Dominican bishops